Montubio is the term used to describe the mestizo people of the countryside of coastal Ecuador. The Montubio make up 7.4% of the country's population and were recognized as a distinct ethnicity by the government in the spring of 2001 after protests that included protracted hunger strikes. The Council for the Development of the Montubio People of the Ecuadorian Coast and Subtropical Zones of the Littoral Region (CODEPMOC) was granted official status and government funding.

The Montubio are known for their ranching activities, rodeos, machetes and distinctive attire (including Panama hats, originally made in Montecristi). In Ecuadorian literature, the Montubios have been written as "a local stock coastal character" by novelist Alfredo Pareja Diezcanseco  and the "Guayaquil Group": Demetrio Aguilera Malta, Enrique Gil Gilberto, and Joaquín Gallegos Lara. They have also been recorded by Jenny Estrada in El Montubio – un forjador de identidad (1996), Teodoro Crespo in El Montuvio: Centro de la Colonización (1959, 2nd Edition), and by José de la Cuadra in El Montuvio Ecuatoriano (1937).

See also
 Cholo pescador

References

Ethnic groups in Ecuador
Mestizo
Ecuadorian culture